The Essex Senate District is one of 16 districts of the Vermont Senate. The current district plan is included in the redistricting and reapportionment plan developed by the Vermont General Assembly following the 2020 U.S. Census, which applies to legislatures elected in 2022, 2024, 2026, 2028, and 2030.

The Caledonia district includes all of Essex County, the Towns of Kirby and Lyndon from Caledonia County, and the Towns of Derby, Holland, and Morgan as well as the City of Newport from Orleans County.

As of the 2020 census, the state as a whole had a population of 643,077. As there are a total of 30 Senators, there were 21,436 residents per senator.

District Senators

As of 2023
Russ Ingalls, Republican

Towns, city, and gores in the Essex district

Caledonia County 
Kirby
Lyndon

Essex County 
Averill
Averys Gore
Bloomfield
Brighton
Canaan
Concord
East Haven
Ferdinand
Granby
Guildhall
Lemington
Lewis
Lunenburg
Maidstone
Norton
Victory
Warner's Grant
Warren's Gore

Orleans County
Derby
Holland
Morgan
Newport (city)

See also
Essex-Orleans Vermont Senate District
Vermont Senate districts, 2012–2022
Vermont Senate districts, 2022–2032

References

External links

Redistricting information from Vermont Legislature
Map of current Essex County Senate district

Vermont Senate districts